Johnny "Guitar" Watson (1935 – 1996) was an American musician and singer-songwriter.

Johnny Watson may also refer to:

 Johnny Watson (1867 – 1963), American blues musician known by the stage name Daddy Stovepipe
 Johnny Watson (1908 – 1965), American baseball player
 Johnny Watson (1963 – 1987), Peruvian footballer

See also 

 Johnie Watson (1896 – 1958), American baseball player
 John Watson (disambiguation)
 Johnny Guitar (disambiguation)